John Nelson House may refer to:

in the United States
(by state, then city)

 John B. Nelson House, Port Penn, Delaware, listed on the National Register of Historic Places (NRHP)
 John R. Nelson House, Quincy, Massachusetts, NRHP-listed
 John Nelson Site, Willows, Mississippi, listed on the NRHP in Claiborne County, Mississippi
 John C. Nelson House, Pascagoula, Mississippi, listed on the NRHP in Jackson County, Mississippi
 John H. Nelson House, Fallowfield, Pennsylvania, NRHP-listed